Miryana Ivanova Basheva (Bulgarian: Миряна Иванова Башева; 11 February 1947 – 12 July 2020) was a Bulgarian poet born in Sofia.
She graduated from the University of Sofia in 1972.

Her poetry was included in the film The Hedgehog's War.

Works
Tezhuk Kharakter (Difficult Personality) 1976
Malka zimna muzika (A small winter music) Vratsa: V. Aleksandrov, Sofiia: Bulgarski pisatel, 1979
Sto godina sueta (A hundred years of folly) 1992

Anthologies

References

1947 births
2020 deaths
Bulgarian poets
Bulgarian women poets
Writers from Sofia
Sofia University alumni